The Winding Path is the sixth studio album from American new age pianist Kevin Kern. As with his preceding and succeeding albums, it is an album of instrumental songs. It was released on June 3, 2003, his first after his best-of album More Than Words: The Best of Kevin Kern.

The album's liner notes feature a guide to healing visualization based around the songs on the album. Kern is joined here by Randy and Pamela Copus, the duo that makes up the new age band 2002.

Track listing
"The Touch of Love" – 4:21
"The Way of the Stream" – 4:21
"A Million Stars" – 4:06
"High Above the Valley" – 5:40
"Ancient Guardians" – 5:03
"Cauldron of Healing" – 5:29
"Filled With Light" – 2:27
"Through the Veil" – 4:49
"Softly Falling" – 4:22
"The Winding Path" – 3:58

Liner Notes
Kevin Kern has become a universal name for beautiful, relaxing music. This intimate, piano-led path through nature creates a resonance of tranquility and peace for pure listening pleasure. Also ideal for massage, meditation, or relieving stress.

The combination of songs on The Winding Path creates a vivid journey easily followed. Detailed instructions for a self-guided healing visualization are included in the booklet.

Personnel
 Kevin Kern – Piano, Keyboards, Producer
 Pamela Gibbs – Rainstick
 Jeff Linsky – Guitar
 Jeremy Cohen – Violin
 Randy Copus – Percussion
 Pamela Copus – Flute, harp
 Terry Miller – Bass guitar
 David Earl – Drum programming
 Terence Yallop – Bell tree, Executive Producer

References

External links
Kevin Kern's official website
Kevin Kern at Real Music

2003 albums
Kevin Kern albums